Mary Katherine "Mary Kay" Fualaau ( Schmitz, formerly Letourneau; January 30, 1962July 6, 2020), was an American teacher who pleaded guilty in 1997 to two counts of felony second-degree rape of a child. The child was Vili Fualaau, who was 12 years old when sexual relations first occurred and had been her sixth-grade student at an elementary school in Burien, Washington. While awaiting sentencing, she gave birth to Fualaau's child. With the state seeking a seven-and-a-half-year prison sentence, she reached a plea agreement calling for six months in jail, with three months suspended, and no contact with Fualaau for life, among other terms. The case received national attention.

Shortly after Letourneau had completed three months in jail, the police caught her in a car with Fualaau. A judge revoked her plea agreement and reinstated the prison sentence for the maximum allowed by law of seven and a half years. Eight months after returning to prison, she gave birth to Fualaau's second child, another daughter. She was imprisoned from 1998 to 2004.

Letourneau and Fualaau were married in May 2005, and the marriage lasted 14 years until their separation in 2019.

Early life 
Mary Katherine Schmitz was born in 1962 in Tustin, California, the daughter of Mary E. ( Suehr), a former chemist, and John G. Schmitz (1930–2001), a community college instructor and politician. She was known as Mary Kay to her family. She was the fourth of seven children, raised in a "strict Catholic household." When Letourneau was two years old, her father began a political career, and successfully ran as a Republican for a seat in the state legislature. He held positions as a California state senator and U.S. Congressman, winning a special election for an unexpired term in 1970, and the general election later that year. After a primary defeat in 1972, he changed parties and ran for president as an American Party candidate in the 1972 U.S. presidential election. In 1973, Letourneau's three-year-old brother drowned in the family pool at their home in the Spyglass Hill section of Corona del Mar, California, while she was playing with another brother in the shallow end.

Letourneau attended Cornelia Connelly High School, an all-girls' Catholic school in Anaheim, California, where she was a member of the cheerleading squad for Servite High School. She later attended Arizona State University.

In 1978, her father was re-elected as a Republican to the California State Senate. He intended to run for the U.S. Senate in 1982, but his political career was permanently damaged that year when it was revealed that he had fathered two children out of wedlock during an affair with a mistress, a former student at Santa Ana College, where he had taught political science. Her father's affair caused Letourneau's parents to separate, but they later reconciled.

Letourneau's brother, John Schmitz, was the deputy counsel to President George H. W. Bush. Her other brother, Joseph E. Schmitz, was Inspector General of the U.S. Department of Defense under President George W. Bush, as well as a senior executive with Academi, and was a foreign policy adviser to President Donald Trump.

First marriage 
While attending Arizona State University, Mary Schmitz met and married fellow student Steve Letourneau, and she conceived the first of four children with him. She later said that she was not in love with Steve, and married him after being urged to do so by her parents. The couple moved to Anchorage, Alaska, where Steve found work as a baggage handler for Alaska Airlines. After a year in Alaska, her husband was transferred to Seattle, Washington, and Mary gave birth to their second child. She graduated from Seattle University in 1989 with a teaching degree. She began teaching second grade at Shorewood Elementary School in the Seattle suburb of Burien.

The Letourneaus' marriage suffered; they had financial problems, and both parties engaged in extramarital affairs. Her attorney and former neighbor, David Gehrke, said that she was "emotionally and physically abused by her husband" during their marriage, and twice "went to the hospital for treatment, and police were called", although no charges were ever filed. While she was imprisoned in May 1999, they divorced, and he gained custody of their four children. In 2010, the Letourneaus became grandparents when their oldest son had a daughter.

Crime, arrest and sentencing 
Vili Fualaau (born June 26, 1983) was Letourneau's student in both his second-grade and sixth-grade classes at Shorewood Elementary. When Letourneau was 34, in the summer of 1996, her relationship with the 12-year-old Fualaau turned from platonic to sexual. On June 18, 1996, police came upon her in a car with Fualaau in a marina parking lot. She was seen jumping into the front seat while Fualaau pretended to sleep in the back. She and Fualaau provided false names when asked for identification, and Fualaau lied about his age, saying that he was 18. Fualaau said that no touching had taken place. Letourneau said she and her husband had gotten into an argument, and that Fualaau, who she said was a family friend who had been staying with them that night, witnessed the argument and ran away upset. She said she left to find him. Letourneau and Fualaau were taken to the police station, where Fualaau's mother was called. The mother was asked what should be done.  She said to return Fualaau to Letourneau. She later said that if the police had alerted her to the fact that Letourneau had lied about Fualaau's age and what had occurred in the car, she would not have allowed her son to go back to Letourneau. Letourneau was arrested on March 4, 1997, after a relative of her husband contacted the police.

Letourneau pleaded guilty to two counts of second-degree child rape. Her first child with Fualaau, a daughter, was born on May 29, 1997, while she was awaiting sentencing. The state sought to sentence her to six and a half years in prison. Through a plea agreement, her sentence was reduced to six months (three of which were suspended) in the county jail and three years of sex offender treatment. She was not required initially to register as a sex offender. As part of her plea agreement, Letourneau could not contact Fualaau or her five children or have contact with any other minors. She became the subject of an international tabloid scandal and experienced symptoms of degraded mental health according to acquaintances.

On February 3, 1998, two weeks after completing her jail sentence, Letourneau was found by police in a car with Fualaau near her home. Letourneau initially said she was alone in the car. She and Fualaau provided false names when asked for identification. Although it was reported that sexual intercourse had occurred in the car, Fualaau told a detective that he and Letourneau had kissed frequently and that he had touched Letourneau on the thigh, but that no sexual intercourse had occurred. There was evidence the two had met several times since Letourneau's release from jail on January 2. When she was arrested, police found $6,200 in cash, baby clothes, and her passport inside the car. Receipts for $850 in purchases made since January 20 for men's, young men's,  and infant clothing were also found. Letourneau said that the money was for dermatology treatments and for her divorce lawyer and that some of the men's clothing were gifts for relatives and for herself since she enjoyed wearing oversized men's clothing.

In February 1998, the judge revoked Letourneau's prior plea agreement and reinstated the prison sentence of seven and a half years for violating the no-contact order. In interviews and in a book on her involvement with Fualaau, Letourneau said she had sex with Fualaau in January. Police said they had seen no evidence that sex had occurred in the car in February. Letourneau served her sentence in the Washington Corrections Center for Women.

While serving her second stint in jail, Letourneau gave birth to her second daughter by Fualaau on October 16, 1998. That year, Letourneau and Fualaau co-authored a book, which was published in France, called Only One Crime, Love. In 1999, a second book appeared, published in the United States, but written with only minimal cooperation from her and none from Fualaau: If Loving You Is Wrong. During her imprisonment, Letourneau was allowed visits from her children but was denied permission to attend her father's funeral. While in prison, Letourneau tutored fellow inmates, created audio books for blind readers, participated in the prison choir and "rarely missed Mass." Because of her notoriety, Letourneau was unpopular with other inmates; she "sassed guards and balked at work" and, reportedly as punishment for this, spent "18 of her first 24 months" in solitary confinement. In one instance, Letourneau served six months in solitary when letters she tried to send to Fualaau were intercepted.

Fualaau dropped out of high school and his mother was granted custody of his two children. He struggled with suicidal depression and alcoholism, attempting suicide in March 1999. In 2002, Fualaau's family sued the Highline School District and the city of Des Moines, Washington, for emotional suffering, lost wages, and the costs of rearing his two children, claiming the school and the Des Moines Police Department had failed to protect him from Letourneau. Following a ten-week trial, no damages were awarded. Attorney Anne Bremner represented the Des Moines Police Department. Her counterpart Michael Patterson represented the Highline School District.

Release from prison and marriage to Fualaau 
Letourneau was released from prison to a community placement program on August 4, 2004, and registered the following day with the King County Sheriff's Office as a level 2 sex offender.

Following Letourneau's release, Fualaau, then age 21, persuaded the court to reverse the no-contact order against her. Letourneau and Fualaau married on May 20, 2005, in the city of Woodinville, Washington, in a ceremony at the Columbia Winery. Exclusive access to the wedding was given to the television show Entertainment Tonight, and photographs were released through other media outlets. Letourneau said she planned to have another child and return to the teaching profession; she indicated that by law she was permitted to teach at private schools and community colleges.

Attorney Anne Bremner, who met and befriended Letourneau in 2002 during Fualaau's civil suit, said that Letourneau considered her relationship with Fualaau to be "eternal and endless". According to Bremner, "Nothing could have kept the two of them apart." In a 2006 interview with NBC News, "[Letourneau] concede[d] she knew it would be wrong to let the relationship go any further, but she says as soon as the school year ended, she and Vili did cross that line." She said that "it did not cross her mind" at the time that having sex with Fualaau would be a crime. In a later interview, she stated, "If someone had told me, if anyone had told me, there is a specific law that says this is a crime, I did not know. I've said this over and over again. Had I'd known, if anyone knows my personality. Just the idea, this would count as a crime." The television series Barbara Walters Presents American Scandals covered the case in December 2015. Host Barbara Walters interviewed the couple about their relationship and their two daughters.

On May 9, 2017, after almost 12 years of marriage, Fualaau filed for separation from Letourneau, but he later withdrew the filing.

As of April 2018, Fualaau was working at a home improvement store and as a professional DJ and Letourneau was working as a legal assistant. An article in People quoted an insider source who said, "They know what everyone thinks about their relationship ... And they don't care. They really never have. The wrong stuff that happened was so long ago. They are two grown adults who are living their lives now."

The couple finalized a legal separation in August 2019. Earlier in the marriage, Vili Fualaau said he was not a victim, and was unashamed of the relationship.  According to People in May 2020, an unnamed source "close to Fualaau" said that, "He sees things clearly now, and realizes that this wasn't a healthy relationship from the start."

Death 
Letourneau died July 6, 2020, at her home in Des Moines, Washington from colorectal cancer. She was 58. Fualaau and her family were at her side despite their separation. In her will and testament, Letourneau left much of her estate to Fualaau.

See also 
 Hebephilia
 List of teachers who married their students
 Sexual harassment in education
 Statutory rape#Female-male statutory rape
 Jennifer Fichter
 Debra Lafave
 Pamela Joan Rogers

References

Further reading 

 
 
  (Request reprint).

External links 
 
 
 Double Standard: The Bias Against Male Victims of Sexual Abuse
 Educator Sexual Misconduct: A Synthesis of Existing Literature
 Mary Kay Letourneau: The Romance That Was A Crime

1962 births
2020 deaths
20th-century American criminals
American female criminals
American people convicted of child sexual abuse
American people of German descent
American people convicted of rape
Arizona State University alumni
Catholics from Washington (state)
Criminals from California
Deaths from cancer in Washington (state)
Deaths from colorectal cancer
Educators from Seattle
People convicted of statutory rape offenses
People from Burien, Washington
People from Tustin, California
Prisoners and detainees of Washington (state)
Schoolteachers from Washington (state)
American women educators
Seattle University alumni
20th-century American women
21st-century American women